Breaksea may refer to:

Places
 Breaksea Island (Western Australia), off the southwestern coast of the mainland, site of the Breaksea Island Lighthouse and Nature Reserve
 Breaksea Island (New Zealand), in Fiordland National Park off the western tip of the South Island
 Breaksea Islands (Tasmania), off the southwestern coast of Tasmania, Australia
 One chain of the Titi / Muttonbird Islands
 Breaksea Point, the southernmost point of mainland Wales, UK

Other uses
 Breaksea cod, a species of fish endemic to Australia